Scott Mark Cameron (born 12 November 1976) is an Olympic swimmer from New Zealand. He swam for New Zealand at the 1996 Olympics.

Alongside Trent Bray, John Davis and Danyon Loader he was part of the bronze medal-winning 4 × 200 m freestyle relay team at the 1998 Commonwealth Games. He trained under Duncan Laing at Moana Pool in Dunedin.

See also
 List of Commonwealth Games medallists in swimming (men)

References

1976 births
Living people
New Zealand male freestyle swimmers
Olympic swimmers of New Zealand
Commonwealth Games bronze medallists for New Zealand
Swimmers at the 1996 Summer Olympics
Swimmers at the 1998 Commonwealth Games
Commonwealth Games medallists in swimming
Swimmers from Dunedin
Medallists at the 1998 Commonwealth Games